P .B. Jayasekara, also known as Premathilaka Jayasekara, is a Sri Lankan short story writer and translator. His short story,  was awarded the first place at the  literary festivals in 1993 and  won the first place at the "Independent literary festival" in 1994.

Works

Short story books
-

Translations
-.
-
 -
Beloved-

Writing career
P.B. Jayasekara started his writing career as a top-level journalist. In the 1980s, he was one of the leading historical article writers in Sri Lanka. His articles were published in The Island and The Sunday Observer.
and  magazines

See Also The Official website of P.B Jayasekara  
http://pbjayasekara.webs.com

Read his short stories online
http://sinhalinketikatha.blogspot.com/
http://pbjayasekara.webs.com/apps/links/

References

External links
Sandesaya Magazine-Official website
http://www.geocites.com/molarslk
Vidarshana publishes
http://www.sinharaja.com/b2bhub/business.asp?xi=506&xp=502&xs=Vidarshana+Publishers

Sinhalese writers
Living people
Sri Lankan short story writers
Year of birth missing (living people)